Mohra Nabi Shah is a town in the Islamabad Capital Territory of Pakistan. It is located at 33° 27' 0N 73° 15' 55E with an altitude of 553 metres (1817 feet).

References 

Union councils of Islamabad Capital Territory